Cleft Island may refer to:

 Cleft Island (Antarctica)
 Cleft Island (Victoria)